Haleangadi or Haleyangady is a village in Mangalore taluk of Dakshina Kannada district of Karnataka. It literally means "Old shop" in the Kannada language, although Byari,Tulu is local lingo. It is a junction on National Highway 66 which connects Cochin to Panvel. An adjacent road goes from NH-66 towards Pakshikere, Kinnigoli, and Kateel. There is also a road from Haleangady to Koluvail towards Arabian sea. This small town is situated in Dakshina Kannada district of Karnataka. It's about 24 km north of Mangalore city.

External links 
Haleangadi Post office 574146

Localities in Mangalore
Villages in Dakshina Kannada district